Wildcat Stadium is an 11,015-seat open-air multi-purpose stadium in Durham, New Hampshire, on the campus of the University of New Hampshire (UNH). It is home to the New Hampshire Wildcats football, lacrosse and track and field varsity teams.  The stadium, which runs west-northwest, consists of a FieldTurf playing surface surrounded by a 400-metre track.  On either side of the track are aluminum stands (the larger home stands being on northeast side).  The stadium lies just southwest of the Field House, which houses Lundholm Gym as well as Swazey Pool and the Jerry Azumah Performance Center.

The stadium is a part of the main athletics area of campus, south of Main Street and west of the railroad tracks.  It replaced Memorial Field, which has since been remodeled for use by women's field hockey, and lies diagonally across Main Street beside the Whittemore Center. The track and field facility surrounding the field is named after Reggie F. Atkins, UNH class of 1928, a star student athlete who in later life donated the funds to start building the facility.

History
The stadium was dedicated on October 10, 1936, with a football rivalry game against the Maine Black Bears. The first football game played in the stadium was actually held two weeks earlier, on September 26, 1936, against Lowell Textile Institute (now University of Massachusetts Lowell). The university's athletic facilities were originally named Lewis Fields after former university president Edward M. Lewis, with the football stadium referred to as Lewis Stadium or simply Lewis Field. In 1952, the stadium was formally named Cowell Stadium in honor of former football coach and athletic director William H. "Butch" Cowell. The field itself is Mooradian Field, named in 1994 to honor Andy Mooradian, a longtime UNH professor, coach, and athletic director.

The stadium went through major renovations during the 2015 offseason. Plans called for a new seating section on the Eastern End Zone side, which included new restrooms, concession, and press box. It also called for restoration of the current Western End Zone seats, along with renaming the stadium.

The stadium hosted the 2020 America East Men's Soccer Tournament.

Scoreboard controversy
The university received criticism for its decision to use a quarter of a $4 million bequest for a video scoreboard at the new $25 million stadium. The donation was made by longtime university librarian, alumnus, and football fan Robert Morin. The $4 million bequest was largely unrestricted with only $100,000 being required to be spent on the library. $2.5 million of the donation was used to fund an expanded career center. The university responded to this criticism by explaining that Morin was a football fan by the end of his life and detailing his following of the football team late in his life. Regardless, many thought it should have been spent otherwise.

See also
 List of NCAA Division I FCS football stadiums

References

External links
 UNH Wildcats - Wildcat Stadium

College football venues
College lacrosse venues in the United States
College track and field venues in the United States
New Hampshire Wildcats football
University of New Hampshire buildings
Sports venues in New Hampshire
Multi-purpose stadiums in the United States
Buildings and structures in Strafford County, New Hampshire
American football venues in New Hampshire
Athletics (track and field) venues in New Hampshire
Sports venues completed in 1936
University and college buildings completed in 1936
New Hampshire Wildcats lacrosse
1936 establishments in New Hampshire